Ryze is a social networking website connecting business professionals, especially entrepreneurs.

Ryze may also refer to:

 Ryze Trampoline Parks, an international chain of trampoline and extreme sports parks
 Ryze (League of Legends), a co-founder of Riot Games, the developer of League of Legends

See also 

 Ryse: Son of Rome, a 2013 video game developed by Crytek
 Ryzen, a brand of microprocessors
 Terra Ryzing, the first ring name of professional wrestler Paul Michael Levesque, better known by the ring name Triple H
 
 Rhys (name)
 Rhyse (disambiguation)
 Rhyze (band)
 Rice (disambiguation)
 Rise (disambiguation)
 Rize (disambiguation)
 Ryce (surname)
 Ryse (disambiguation)
 Rys (disambiguation)